Pietertje van Splunter (born 24 July 1968 in Goedereede) is a painter living in the Netherlands. She attended the of Royal Academy of Art (The Hague), The Hague. In the beginning of the 90's she worked on a series of postcards which she had sent to herself while travelling. In recent years she has seriously studied connections between painting and spatial consciousness.

References

External links

1968 births
Living people
Postcard artists
People from Goedereede
Dutch women painters
Royal Academy of Art, The Hague alumni
20th-century Dutch women artists
21st-century Dutch women artists